A hoax is deliberate false information.

Hoax may also refer to:

Books
"The Hoax", (Italian : Una burla riuscita), 1930 story by Italo Svevo
Hoax (book) Hoax: Donald Trump, Fox News and the Dangerous Distortion of Truth  2020 non-fiction book by  Brian Stelter.
The Hoax, Clifford Irving 1981

Film
The Hoax, 2006 American drama film starring Richard Gere
The Hoax (1972 film) comedy film
Hoax (film), a 2019 American horror film

Music
The Hoax, British band 1994-1999 Robin Davey
Hoax (band), American band
The Hoax (band), Christian hardcore band 
"Hoax", a song from Folklore (Taylor Swift album)